The Wright Endurance was a step-entrance single-decker bus body on Mercedes-Benz, Scania N113 and on Volvo B10B chassis by Wrightbus between 1993 and 1997.

The Endurance was built on 26 Scania N113 chassis for Midland Bluebird. Of the 292 Endurance bodies completed on Volvo B10B chassis, MTL North purchased 120, West Midlands Travel 67 and GM Buses North 55.

The Endurance was superseded by the Liberator on the Volvo B10L chassis.

Related designs
Endurance-style bodywork was also built on Mercedes-Benz chassis, in which forms it was given different names.

UrbanRanger
The UrbanRanger was more similar to the Endurance, being of almost identical appearance. Only sixteen were built, the first, a demonstrator for Mercedes-Benz, being registered in July 1994. It was later sold to Midland Choice of Willenhall, who also purchased three others new. The final four examples were not sold until 1998, when they went to Chambers of Moneymore in Northern Ireland.

Buckinghamshire Fire and Rescue Service purchased an UrbanRanger-bodied Mercedes-Benz OH1416 for use as a mobile command unit, and the Irish Army purchased one for troop transportation.

CityRanger

The CityRanger was based on the Mercedes-Benz O405 chassis, and though structurally similar to the Endurance, it differed visually by having Mercedes' own front end design, as well as shallower side windows. Only 22 were built, 20 of which were for FirstGroup's Grampian and Midland Bluebird subsidiaries in Scotland. The Grampian batch of fourteen, which featured bonded glazing, were later transferred to First Manchester.

The O405 chassis was later offered with Optare Prisma bodywork (which carried the same Mercedes-design front end as the CityRanger, but differed in the side and rear aspects), and these were somewhat more numerous than the Wright product.

Preservation
One Volvo B10B has been preserved by the North West Vehicle Restoration Trust, Liverpool.

References

External links

Step-entrance buses
Vehicles introduced in 1993
Liberator